The Conservative Workers & Trade Unionists (CWTU) is an organisation part of the Conservative Party in the United Kingdom which aims at reaching out to support working people and trade unionists. It is focused on improving employment rights, tackling low pay, raising productivity and supporting greater employment satisfaction.

The organisation was founded by Robert Halfon MP, former deputy chairman of the Conservative Party and Spencer Pitfield, former director of the Conservative Policy Forum. Spencer Pitfield is the organisation's current director and former Conservative Parliamentary Candidate, Richard Short, is deputy director.

Principles
 Britain should be a country that works for everyone
 Working people create wealth for their families and communities
 Working people deserve fulfillment and health across their lives 
 Businesses, workers and government all have responsibility to improve productivity
 Society should always value and support hard working people
 There should be a constructive working relationship between the Conservative Party and Trade Unions.

References

External links
 
 Conservative Party website

British trade unions history
Organisations associated with the Conservative Party (UK)